Kuzhandhaigal Kanda Kudiyarasu is a 1960 Indian Tamil language film,  directed by B. R. Panthulu. The film stars Panthulu, M. V. Rajamma, K. Sarangapani and Javar Seetharaman. It was simultaneously made in Kannada as Makkala Rajya  and in Telugu as Pillalu Thechina Challani Rajyam. Narasimharaju and Balakrishna play pivotal roles in the Kannada version while Javar Seetharaman and K. Sarangapani play supportive roles in the Tamil version. This film was partly coloured by Gevacolor and processed at the Film Centre, Mumbai. Umesh made his film debut with this film. Tamil actor Nagesh made his Kannada debut with this film.

Plot 

A scientist takes children to an unknown planet, where they establish a democratic republic.

Cast 

Principal cast
B. R. Panthulu
M. V. Rajamma
Sivaji Ganesan as Scientist (guest role)
Tamil version
Javar Seetharaman as King
K. Sarangapani
C. Lakshmi Rajyam
Kannada version
 Dikki Madhava Rao
 B. Hanumanthachar
 Master Umesh
 Narasimharaju
 Balakrishna
 Chi. Udaya Shankar
 Veerabhadrappa
 M. N. Lakshmi Devi
 Master Venkatesh
 Jayakumari

Soundtrack 
Music by T. G. Lingappa for all languages. All the tunes for all the songs for Kannada, Tamil and Telugu languages are the same.

Kannada Songs

Lyrics were written by Kanagal Prabhakar Shastry and C. Sadashivaiah.

Tamil Songs

Lyrics were written by Ku. Ma. Balasubramaniam.

Telugu Songs

Lyrics were written by were written by Samudrala Sr. and Kosaraju. Playback singers P. B. Sreenivas, Seerkazhi Govindarajan,  P. Susheela, Jikki, S. Janaki, K. Jamuna Rani, K. Rani, A. P. Komala, L. R. Eswari & M. S. Padma.

References

External links 
 
 
 

1960 films
1960s Kannada-language films
1960s multilingual films
1960s science fiction films
1960s Tamil-language films
Films directed by B. R. Panthulu
Films scored by T. G. Lingappa
Indian multilingual films
Indian science fiction films